The 559th Flying Training Squadron is part of the 12th Flying Training Wing based at Randolph Air Force Base, Texas.  It operates the Beechcraft T-6 Texan II conducting flying training.

History

World War II
The 559th was initially constituted as the 81st Bombardment Squadron, Light on 20 November 1940, assigned to the 12th Bombardment Group, Light but wasn’t activated (considered the unit’s “birthday”) until 15 January 1941 at McChord Field, Washington.  The squadron's original manning came from the 34th Bombardment Squadron consisting of 27 enlisted men and 1 officer, Major John J. O'Hara, who assumed command.  Over the ensuing six months the squadron's ranks swelled to 190 enlisted men and 15 officers.

The 81st used one Douglas B-18 Bolo, one Douglas B-23 Dragon, and two PT-17 Kaydets, to conduct flight training while some of its rated personnel attended various Air Corps technical schools or on detached service with the Ferrying Command.  The squadron was equipped with the North American B-25 Mitchell in January 1942 and redesignated a medium bombardment squadron.  Shortly thereafter the 12th Bombardment Group was transferred to Esler Field, Camp Beauregard, Louisiana.  Soon after arriving the squadron initiated a training program which included all phases of combat flying, bombing, and gunnery.  Bombing practice was conducted on the range in the Kisatchie National Forest, while gunnery training was accomplished in Army Air Forces schools at Panama City, Florida, and Las Vegas, Nevada.  The squadron also participated in general field operations training near DeRidder, Louisiana.  In late the 81st served as part of a detachment force of 40 aircraft and 450 officers and men that was sent to Stockton, California, for over-water training.

In June 1942 the squadron began its movement overseas.  The air echelon staged at Morrison Field, Florida.  On 14 July it flew to Accra, British West Africa then on to Khartoum in Anglo-Egyptian Sudan, and Cairo, Egypt.  By mid-August the air echelon was in place at Deversoir, Egypt. The ground echelon had left Esler Field by train on 3 July for Fort Dix, New Jersey, where it boarded the SS Louis Pasteur and sailed from New York on 16 July, arriving at Freetown, Sierra Leone, eight days later.  The personnel then sailed around the Cape of Good Hope, via Durban, South Africa, and arrived at Port Tewfik, Egypt, on 16 August.  Two days later the ground echelon arrived at Deversoir.

Upon its arrival the 81st underwent a training period with light bomber wings of the Royal Air Force and the South African Air Force.  This training included five missions intended to acquaint the American aircrews with aids to navigation in the Middle East.  The first mission was flown on the night of 16 August 1942 and consisted of a bombing attack on the harbor at Mersa Matruh.  The raid was followed by attacks on Axis airdromes at Doba and Fuka, and on docks at Tobruk, Libya.

In September the 81st Bombardment Squadron went into action with the RAF's Desert Air Force in support of the British Eighth Army.  One of the unit's earliest missions was a night raid on Sidi Haneish, in which it lost three bombers.  During the weeks which followed the squadron struck Axis landing grounds, transportation facilities, and troop concentrations.  After the Battle of El Alamein the squadron conducted a brief training program consisting principally of aerial gunnery, navigational flights, and night landings.  The squadron resumed combat operations in December after rebasing further west.  It participated in the pursuit of Field Marshal Rommel's Afrika Korps to Tripoli, which fell late in January 1943.

In February 1943 the 81st was sent to Algeria, where it joined elements of the Twelfth Air Force in support of Allied ground forces pushing eastward.  After the German forces had been defeated in Africa the squadron was stationed at Hergla, Tunisia, and began participation in the Pantellerian campaign by pattern bombing coastal batteries on the island of Pantelleria.  Following the capitulation of Axis forces in Pantelleria, on 11 June, the squadron conducted an intensive, three-week, program for training replacement crews recently arrived from the Zone of the Interior.  The squadron also received replacement aircraft bringing the total from 13 to 24.

Through July the squadron conducted bombing operations against Axis aerodromes, harbor installations, and towns on the island of Sicily.  Early in August it transferred to Ponte Olivo Airdrome, Sicily, whence it continued to operate against Sicilian targets until the island was completely cleared of Axis forces.  On 23 August the squadron moved to Gerbini Main Airdrome, Sicily, preliminary to entering the Italian campaign.  From September to early-November 1943, the 81st flew numerous missions in support of the American Fifth Army and the British Eighth Army then in the early stages of the Invasion of Italy.  The types of targets most frequently attacked were rail junctions and marshalling yards, airdromes, landing grounds, highway bridges, gun emplacements, and troop concentrations.  After rebasing to Foggia Main, Italy, on 10 November the squadron increased the range of its bombing missions to include Yugoslavia.  Prior to the end of January 1944 it participated in 10 raids on harbor and dock facilities along the Yugoslavian Adriatic Coast, at Zadar, Split, and Šibenik.  In addition, the squadron flew a mission against the Mostar Main Airdrome in Yugoslavia and another directed at the Eleusis Airdrome in Greece.  The 81st Bombardment Squadron's final Italian Campaign mission took place on 30 January 1944 in an intended attack upon a road junction near Rome.  A cloud covering completely obscured the target as the bombers approached, however, so they aborted the mission.

The squadron was transferred to the China-Burma-India Theater of Operations and consequently spent seven weeks relocating.  On 9 February the entire unit sailed from Taranto, Italy, aboard the English vessel Diwara, for Port Said, Egypt then by train to Cairo, and then sailed, again aboard the Dilwara, from Port Tewfik for Bombay, India.  From Bombay it moved by train and a Ganges River boat to Tezgaon Airdrome near Calcutta.  Equipped with new bombers, it initiated a training program in low-level attack and bombing methods which were being used extensively in that area at the time.

The 81st entered combat on 16 April 1944 when it dispatched 12 B-25s in an attack upon railway sidings and a Japanese supply dump at Mogaung, Burma.  One bomber was lost in the raid.  Eight days later the 81st attacked Japanese stores and troop concentrations in the Kazu area.  In May the it made numerous attacks upon the Tiddim Road in Burma, as well as on railway lines running north and east of Mandalay.  Probably the unit's most significant mission during the month was its participation in the bombing of Ningthoukhong, Burma, a key position to the Japanese defensive line.  The town was reported to have housed Japanese artillery pieces, antitank guns, tanks, and as many as 1,000 troops.

During the ensuing 12 months the 81st helped to gain air superiority over the Japanese in Burma and provided support for Allied ground forces in driving them completely out of that country.  The squadron's efforts were expended principally in bombing attacks on airdromes and airfields, headquarters buildings, roads, highway bridges, gun emplacements, railway bridges, rail junctions, marshalling yards, storage areas, and troop concentrations.  Notable was the series of missions which contributed to the capture of Myritkyina by General Joseph W. Stilwell's ground forces early in August.  The unit also participated in tactical operations during February and March 1945 helping to capture Miektila and Mandalay in May.

In September 1944 the unit extended its range of operations to include targets in China.  At that time the Japanese were attempting to throw the Chinese back across the Salween River.  The 81st provided effective support to the Chinese troops engaged in repelling the Japanese offensive.  For its part the squadron participated in a series of eight bombing missions targeting Japanese stores and troop concentrations, principally in the Chinese cities of Bhamo, Mangshih, and Wanling.

With the capture of Burma in the spring of 1945, combat operations for the 81st Bombardment Squadron were greatly reduced.  At its base in India the unit began transition training in Douglas A-26 Invader aircraft.  Training ceased with the surrender of Japan in August 1945.  The air echelon of the squadron left India on 27 September on the first leg of its journey back to the Zone of the Interior.  Departure of the ground echelon was delayed, however, was delayed for three months, sailing on Christmas Eve 1945 it Karachi, India, aboard the Hawaiian Shipper, for Seattle, Washington.  There was a brief stop in Singapore, after which the voyage was continued out through the South China Sea and into the Pacific.  On 21 January the squadron was reduced in strength to one officer and two enlisted men and then inactivated at Fort Lawton, Washington.

Post War activation
Fifteen months later, on 19 May 1947, it was activated at Langley Field, Virginia as a light bombardment squadron.  Without ever having been manned, however, the squadron was inactivated on 10 September 1948.

Strategic fighter operations
The squadron was redesignated the 559th Fighter-Escort Squadron, and assigned to Strategic Air Command on 27 October 1950.  On 1 November it was activated at Turner Air Force Base, Georgia assigned to the 12th Fighter-Escort Group.  Early in December 1950 it transferred to Bergstrom Air Force Base, Texas.  The primary mission of the 559th was to organize and train a force capable of providing immediate fighter escort and air base protection in any part of the world.  In January 1951 the squadron began flying training in the Republic F-84 Thunderjet.  The program principally of routine transition training, night flying, instrument flights, and ground controlled approaches.  Bombing and gunnery practice was accomplished at the Matagorda Island Bombing and Gunnery Range on Matagorda Island, just off the Texas coast.  Late in April the squadron participated in a practice mission to Turner Air Force Base.  Early in June the 559th participated in a long-range escort mission conducted by the 12th Fighter-Escort Wing.  All told, 75 F-84s were involved.  After staging at Wright Patterson Air Force Base, Ohio, they were divided into two sections.  One section escorted a large number of B-36 Peacemakers in a simulated bombing mission over New York City.  The other section escorted another group of B-36s in a similar mission over Detroit.  All the Thunderjets staged at Selfridge Air Force Base, Michigan, before returning to Bergstrom.

In mid-July 1951 the 559th went on temporary duty to RAF Manston, England. The move was made by the Military Air Transport Service and by civilian aircraft. Having left its own fighter aircraft at Bergstrom, the wing used F-84s of the 31st Fighter-Escort Wing which it replaced at Manston. Operations overseas began during the latter part of July with orientation flights to various United States Air Force bases in England. During August all units of the 12th Wing took part in a 7th Air Division operation which was designed to measure the defense of Norway. While in England the 559th Fighter-Escort Squadron and its two companion units, the 560th and 561st Squadrons, went to Wheelus Field, Libya, for two weeks of gunnery practice. Late in November 1951 the wing began moving back to the United States. The advanced and rear echelons were airlifted all the way from Manston to Austin by MATS aircraft. Back at Bergstrom the squadron was equipped with new F-84s.

In January 1953 the 559th was redesignated as a strategic fighter squadron. In May it deployed to Chitose Air Base, Japan for approximately 90 days.  The principal purpose of the deployment was to provide training for the wing and enable it, while operating as a part of the Northern Area Air Defense Command, to augment the Japanese Air Defense Force.  On 15 May replaced the 508th Strategic Fighter Wing on rotation in Japan.  On 12 June the commanding officer of the 559th Squadron, Lieutenant Colonel Paul M. Hall, was killed in an airplane crash while making a ground-controlled approach.  The squadron redeployed to Bergstrom Air Force Base in August.

Over a period of several months after returning to its home base in August 1953, the 559th Strategic Fighter Squadron made special efforts to qualify all of its aircrews as combat ready.  At the same time it was interested in requalifying combat ready crews in various phases of bombing and gunnery techniques.  For these purposes extensive use was made of the bombing and gunnery range facilities on Matagorda Island.  In May 1954, however, the 559th again deployed to Japan on temporary duty to Misawa Air Base.  One of the most important operations during this second tour of duty in the Far East was a series of exercises in which the capabilities of the Northern Air Defense Area were tested.  The wing returned to the United States again in August 1954.

While stationed at Bergstrom Air Force Base during the next several years the 559th continued to accomplish the usual training programs and routine training missions.  There were, however, a number of special missions and other activities.  In June 1955 the unit participated in weapons loading exercise and unit simulated combat mission at Gray Air Force Base, Texas.  Operating from the forward staging base (Gray AFB), F-84s of the 559th were scheduled to destroy a number of targets simulated on Matagorda Island.  On this mission the Thunderjets accomplished air refueling over Roswell, New Mexico.  Meanwhile, in May 1955 the 12th Strategic Fighter Wing was selected to represent the Strategic Air Command in the annual fighter competition to be held in connection with the USAF Gunnery Meet in September 1955 at Nellis Air Force Base, Nevada.  A group of candidates began training on Matagorda Island in June.  Selected for the competition were two officers from the 12th Wing headquarters, and one each from the 559th, 560th, and 561st Squadrons.  Competing at Nellis in September against this special team from the Strategic Air Command were other teams from the Air Defense Command, Far East Air Forces, Tactical Air Command, and United States Air Forces in Europe.  At the meet the Strategic Air Command took third place, running behind those of the Far East Air Forces and the United States Air Forces in Europe.  Additionally, during the early part of May 1956 the 559th began participation with the 560th in the deployment of 25 F-84s for approximately 90 days at Eielson Air Force Base, Alaska.  The purpose of the operation was to furnish a competent fighter offensive within the Alaskan Air Command.  In addition to carrying out routine aircrew training, while at Eielson the detachment took part in several Fifteenth Air Force emergency war plan missions.  At the conclusion of the temporary duty in Alaska the detachment flew nonstop back to its home base. The 27th Air refueling Squadron provided in-flight refueling for the redeployment.

Plans announced at Bergstrom as early as April 1956 indicated that in due course of time the 559th would convert to the long-range F-101 Voodoo.  A tentative schedule for equipping with the F-101 was set for May through October 1957.  Training in the new aircraft for aircrews and maintenance personnel of the wing began at Bergstrom in November 1956.  This training was discontinued after about a month, however, following a decision by higher headquarters not to equip the wing with the F-101 aircraft.
 
Effective 1 July 1957, the 559th was redesignated a fighter-day squadron and assigned to the Tactical Air Command.  The wing and its squadrons were inactivated, however, on 8 January 1958.

Tactical fighter operations
On 17 April 1962 the 559th Fighter-Day Squadron was redesignated the 559th Tactical Fighter Squadron.  At the same time it was activated and assigned to the Tactical Air Command. Effective 25 April 1962, the squadron was organized at MacDill Air Force Base, Florida, with further assignment to the 12th Tactical Fighter Wing. The squadron augmented air defenses of Okinawa from, June–September 1965 and participated in combat operations over Southeast Asia from, 2 January 1966 – 23 March 1970.

Flying training
The unit was redesignated the 559th Flying Training Squadron in 1972, located at Randolph AFB, Texas, initially operating the Cessna T-37 jet trainer. It has since trained US and friendly nation instructor aircrews from May 1972 to the present time.

Operations
World War II
Vietnam War

Lineage
 Constituted as the 81st Bombardment Squadron (Light) on 20 November 1940
 Activated on 15 January 1941
 Redesignated 81st Bombardment Squadron (Medium) on 30 December 1941
 Redesignated 81st Bombardment Squadron, Medium on 9 October 1944
 Inactivated on 22 January 1946
 Redesignated 81st Bombardment Squadron, Light on 29 April 1947
 Activated on 19 May 1947
 Inactivated on 10 September 1948
 Redesignated 559th Fighter-Escort Squadron on 27 October 1950
 Activated on 1 November 1950
 Redesignated 559th Strategic Fighter Squadron on 20 January 1953
 Redesignated 559th Fighter-Day Squadron on 1 July 1957
 Inactivated on 8 January 1958
 Redesignated 559th Tactical Fighter Squadron and activated on 17 April 1962 (not organized)
 Organized on 25 April 1962
 Inactivated on Inactivated on 31 March 1970
 Redesignated 559th Flying Training Squadron on 22 March 1972
 Activated on 1 May 1972

Assignments
 12th Bombardment Group, 15 January 1941 – 22 January 1946
 12th Bombardment Group, 19 May 1947 – 10 September 1948
 12th Fighter-Escort Group, 1 November 1950 (attached to 12th Fighter-Escort Wing after 10 February 1951)
 12th Fighter-Escort Wing (later 12th Strategic Fighter Wing, 12th Fighter-Day Wing), 16 June 1952 – 8 January 1958
 Tactical Air Command, 17 April 1962 (not organized)
 12th Tactical Fighter Wing, 25 April 1962 (attached to 51st Fighter-Interceptor Wing 12 June-c. 7 September 1965)
 836th Air Division, 8 November 1965
 12th Tactical Fighter Wing, 27 December 1965 – 31 March 1970
 12th Flying Training Wing, 1 May 1972
 12th Operations Group, 15 December 1991 – present

Stations

 McChord Field, Washington, 15 January 1941
 Esler Field, Louisiana, 27 February-3 July 1942 (operated from Stockton Army Air Field, California 24 May-24 June 1942)
 Deversoir Air Base, Egypt, Egypt, 30 Jul 1942
 Landing Ground LG 88, Egypt, 18 October 1942
 Gambut Main (LG 139, Libya, 6 December 1942
 El Magrun Landing Ground (LG 142), Libya, 14 December 1942
 Gambut Main (LG 139), Libya, 17 December 1942
 Tmed El Chel Airfield, Libya, 11 January 1943
 Berteaux Airfield, Algeria, 3 February 1943
 Canrobert Airfield, Algeria, 15 March 1943
 Thibar, Tunisia, 1 May 1943
 Hergla Airfield, Tunisia, 2 June 1943
 Ponte Olivo Airfield, Sicily, Italy, c. 2 August 1943
 Gerbini Airfield, Sicily, Italy, 22 August 1943
 Foggia Main Airfield, Italy, 5 November 1943
 Gaudo Airfield, Italy, 18 January-6 February 1944

 Tezgaon Airfield, India (Bangla Desh). 20 March 1944
 Madhaiganj Airfield, India, 13 June 1944
 Fenny Airfield, India, 17 July 1944 (operated from Meiktila, Burma 21–29 April 1945)
 Madhaiganj Airfield, India (Bangla Desh), 7 June 1945
 Karachi, India (Pakistan), 15 November-24 December 1945
 Ft. Lawton, Washington, 21–22 January 1946
 Langley Field (later Langley Air Force Base), Virginia, 19 May 1947 – 10 September 1948
 Turner Air Force Base, Georgia, 1 November 1950
 Bergstrom Air Force Base, Texas, 5 December 1950 – 8 January 1958 (deployed to RAF Manston, England 18 July-30 November 1951, Chitose Air Base, Japan 15 May-10 August 1953, Misawa Air Base, Japan 12 May-11 August 1954)
 MacDill Air Force Base, Florida, 25 April 1962 (deployed to Naha Air Base, Okinawa 12 June-7 September 1965)
 Cam Ranh Air Base, South Vietnam, 27 December 1965 – 31 March 1970
 Randolph Air Force Base, Texas, 1 May 1972 – present

Aircraft
 Douglas B-18 Bolo (1941–1942)
 North American B-25 Mitchell (1942–1945)
 Douglas A-26 Invader (1945)
 Republic F-84 Thunderjet (1950–1957)
 McDonnell F-4 Phantom II (1964–1970)
 Cessna T-37 Tweet (1972–present)
 Beechcraft T-6 Texan II (2000–present)

References

Notes
 Explanatory notes

 Citations

Bibliography
 
 
 

 Further reading
 
 Coles, Harry C., (1945)  Ninth Air Force in the Western Desert Campaign to 23 January 1943, USAF Historical Study No. 30
 Coles, Harry C., (1945)  Participation by the Ninth and Twelfth Air Forces in the Sicilian Campaign, USAF Historical Study No. 37

0559
Military units and formations in Texas